Mouez Hassen (born 5 March 1995) is a professional footballer who plays as a goalkeeper for Tunisian Ligue Professionnelle 1 side Club Africain. Born in France, he plays for the Tunisia national team.

Early life
Hassen was born in Fréjus, Var.

Career

Nice
Hassen made his Ligue 1 debut on 25 September 2013 in a 2–0 away defeat against FC Nantes.

Southampton
On 31 January 2017, Hassen signed a five-month loan deal with Southampton, where he was re-united with his former manager, Claude Puel, although he made no appearances for the club.

Châteauroux
Hassen joined Châteauroux on loan on 9 July 2017.

Cercle Brugge
On 1 November 2019, Hassen signed a one-season contract with a one-season extension option with Belgian First Division A club Cercle Brugge.

Club Africain
On 9 September 2021 he joined Tunisian club Club Africain.

International career
Hassen made his debut for Tunisia keeping a clean sheet in an international friendly against Costa Rica on 27 March 2018 at the Allianz Riviera in Nice.

In June 2018, it was revealed that Hassen had faked being injured during two international friendly matches against Portugal and Turkey to allow teammates to eat food mid-game and break their fast during the month of Ramadan.

In June 2018, he was named in Tunisia's 23-man squad for the 2018 FIFA World Cup in Russia.

Career statistics

Club

International

Honours
Southampton
EFL Cup runner-up: 2016–17

References

External links
 
 

1995 births
Living people
Sportspeople from Fréjus
French footballers
France youth international footballers
France under-21 international footballers
Tunisian footballers
Tunisia international footballers
Association football goalkeepers
OGC Nice players
Southampton F.C. players
LB Châteauroux players
Cercle Brugge K.S.V. players
Stade Brestois 29 players
Club Africain players
Ligue 1 players
Ligue 2 players
Belgian Pro League players
2018 FIFA World Cup players
2019 Africa Cup of Nations players
French expatriate footballers
Expatriate footballers in Belgium
Expatriate footballers in England
French expatriate sportspeople in Belgium
French expatriate sportspeople in England
French sportspeople of Tunisian descent
Footballers from Provence-Alpes-Côte d'Azur
2022 FIFA World Cup players